27 Guns is an action, adventure biopic film about Yoweri Museveni and his military colleagues during the Ugandan Bush War. It was directed by Natasha Museveni Karugire, Yoweri Museveni's daughter, and premiered in Kampala on September 8, 2018 and was later screened in Johannesburg South Africa on September 19.

Casting
The lead role of Yoweri Kaguta Museveni was given to Arnold Mubangizi as his debut role. Diana Museveni Kamuntu played her mother Janet Kataha Museni
 Arnold Mubangizi  - Yoweri Kaguta Museveni 
 Diana Museveni Kamuntu - Janet Kataha Museni 
 Sezi Jedediah Nuwewenka - Salim Saleh 
 Godwin Ahimbisibwe  - Akanga Byaruhanga 
 Precious Kamwine Amanya - Joy Mirembe 
 Daphne Ampire - Joviah Saleh 
 Einstein Ayebare - Sam Katabarwa
 T. Steve Ayeny - Julius Oketta
 Geofrey Bukenya - Sam Magara
 Patrick Kabayo - Fred Nkuranga Rubereza 
 Diana Kahunde - Berna Karugaba 
 Daniel Kandiho - Fred Mugisha 
 Bint Kasede - Kizza Besigye 
 Allan Katongole - Moses Kigongo 
 Alvin Katungi - Chef Ali 
 Kenny Katuramu - Pecos Kutesa 
 Aggie Kebirungi - Dora Kutesa 
 Aganza Kisaka - Proscovia Nalweyiso 
 Cleopatra Koheirwe - Alice Kaboyo 
 Timothy Magara - Andrew Lutaaya 
 John Magyezi - Fred Rwigyema 
 Patrick Massa - Ruhakana Rugunda 
 Melvin Mukasa - Jim Muhwezi
 Daniel Murungi - Arthur Kasasira 
 Elvis Edward Mutebi - Matayo Kyaligonza 
 Jenkins Mutumba - Elly Tumwine 
 Nicholas Nsubuga - Ivan Koreta 
 Ivan Ungeyigiu - Julius Chihandae 
 Lenz Vivasi  - Patrick Lumumba 
 Michael Wawuyo Jr.

Production
Shooting for 27 Guns started on August 8, 2017 and went on for ninety days. The film trailer was released in May 2018. The film was shot in Mpigi/ Singo, Buikwe and Kampala with the cast and crew staff stationed at the locations for the entire shoot. Isaiah 60 Productions ran all the production and distribution of the film.

References

External links 
 

Films shot in Uganda
Films set in Uganda
2018 films
Ugandan war films
2010s action adventure films
2010s English-language films